Stezhensky is a rural locality (a khutor) and the administrative center of Stezhenskoye Rural Settlement, Alexeyevsky District, Volgograd Oblast, Russia. The population was 370 as of 2010.

Geography 
Stezhensky is located 4 km west of Alexeyevskaya (the district's administrative centre) by road. Pomalinsky is the nearest rural locality.

References 

Rural localities in Alexeyevsky District, Volgograd Oblast